Ruon Kuk Tongyik is a professional football (soccer) player who plays as a central defender for  Mes Kerman, on loan from Western Sydney Wanderers. Born in South Sudan, he represents Australia internationally.

Personal life
Born in South Sudan, Tongyik lived there for about three years, and had stayed with relatives in Ethiopia while documents allowing him and his family to move to Australia were processed. Tongyik moved to Australia in 2003, aged 6. He has 3 younger sisters and 1 younger brother. They all currently live in Adelaide.

Club career

Melbourne City
After being named Adelaide United's "Youth Player of the Year", Tongyik joined Melbourne City in July 2016 on a 2-year contract. He made his debut for Melbourne City on 9 December 2016, starting in a match against Sydney FC, playing a calm and composed game.

Western Sydney Wanderers
On 3 May 2018, Tongyik was released by Melbourne City and joined Western Sydney Wanderers. In January 2019, he was released by Western Sydney Wanderers.

Brisbane Roar
On 6 February 2019 Brisbane Roar FC announced that Tongyik had signed for the club for the remainder of the 2018–19 season.

Central Coast Mariners
In May 2019, a month after being released by Brisbane Roar, Tongyik signed with Central Coast Mariners on a 2-year deal. Tongyik had a strong first season with the club, culminating in a debut for the Australian national team. Tongyik started to fall out of favour with the Mariners the following season with the emergence of Dan Hall and was released at the conclusion of the 2021-22 season after two seasons with the Mariners.

Western Sydney Wanderers (2nd Stint)
After leaving the Central Coast Mariners, Tongyik re-joined the Western Sydney Wanderers on a two-year contract.

International career
After representing Australia at under-23 level, he was called up by the South Sudan national team in September 2019.

Tongyik received his first selection for the Australian national team in May 2021.  He made his international debut on 7 June 2021 in a World Cup Qualifier against Chinese Taipei.

Career statistics

International

References

External links

1996 births
Living people
Australian soccer players
Australia youth international soccer players
Australia international soccer players
South Sudanese footballers
Australian people of South Sudanese descent
Sportspeople of South Sudanese descent
South Sudanese emigrants to Australia
Association football defenders
Adelaide United FC players
Melbourne City FC players
Western Sydney Wanderers FC players
Brisbane Roar FC players
Central Coast Mariners FC players
National Premier Leagues players
A-League Men players
Sanat Mes Kerman F.C. players
Persian Gulf Pro League players
Expatriate footballers in Iran